Melanie C is an English singer, songwriter, DJ, actress, dancer, entrepreneur, television personality and fitness model. She rose to fame in 1996, releasing, in two years with the Spice Girls, two consecutive number one albums, eight number one singles from nine worldwide hits, the biggest-selling debut single of all time and the biggest-selling album in music history by a girl group, respectively with "Wannabe" atop in 37 countries with over seven million records, and Spice, which peaked at number one in more than 17 countries across the world, with over 31 million copies, as well as the second album Spiceworld with more than 20 million copies sold. Melanie C is known for her unique vocal prowess that helped shoot the Spice Girls to international stardom. Chisholm began her solo career in late 1998 by singing with Canadian rock singer Bryan Adams, and her solo debut album Northern Star was released in 1999, reaching number one in Sweden and number 4 on the UK Albums Chart. It was certified internationally with seven platinum and three gold certifications, including the triple-Platinum by the British Phonographic Industry, selling over 4 million copies worldwide, and becoming the best selling solo album of any Spice Girls member.

Having co-written 11 UK number ones, more than any other female artist in chart history, she remains the only female performer to top the charts as a solo artist, as part of a duo, quartet and quintet. With twelve UK number one singles, including the charity single as part of The Justice Collective, she is the second female artist – and the first British female artist – with most singles at number one in the United Kingdom, and with a total of fourteen songs that have received the number one in Britain (including the double A-sides), Chisholm is the female artist with most songs at number one in the UK ranking history. Her work has earned her several awards and nominations, including three Guinness World Record book mentions, three World Music Awards, one IFPI European Platinum Awards, three MTV Europe Music Awards from ten nominations, five Brit Awards from ten nominations, two Ivor Novello Awards from four nomination, ten ASCAP awards, three American Music Awards, four Billboard Music Awards from seven nomination, six Billboard special awards from nine nominations, one MTV Video Music Awards from two nomination, one Echo Awards from four nominations, one Eska Music Awards, and one Juno Award from two nominations. In addition, she gained one Laurence Olivier nomination and one WhatsOnStage Award for her theatrical work. Since 1996, Chisholm has sold more than 123 million records, including 100 million copies with the group, and 23 million solo albums, singles and collaborations, and has earned over 326 worldwide certifications (with numerous diamonds), including 41 silver, gold and platinum certifications as a solo artist.

Awards and nominations

References

Chisholm, Melanie